The Taiwan Traditional Theatre Center (TTTC), also known as the Xiqu Center of Taiwan, is a performance center in Shilin District, Taipei, Taiwan.

History
The topping out of the center construction happened on 22 July 2014. The center was completed in mid 2015 and officially opened in 2016.

Architecture
The center consists of the main theater, experimental theater, plaza, terrace and Taiwan Music Institute which spreads across an area of 1.76 hectares with a shape of 'one table, two chairs'.

Transportation
The center is accessible within walking distance west from Zhishan Station of Taipei Metro.

See also
 List of tourist attractions in Taiwan

References

External links

 

2016 establishments in Taiwan
Buildings and structures in Taipei
Theatres completed in 2015
Theatres in Taiwan
Chinese opera theatres